The Rooftops (Arabic لسطوح, transliteration: Es-stouh) is a 2013 Algerian film directed by Merzak Allouache. The film premiered at the 2013 London Film Festival.

References

External links
 

2013 films
Algerian drama films